David Anderson (born 1 August 1945 in Rutherglen, Scotland) is a Scottish actor, playwright and jazz musician based in Glasgow.

He is known for the part of Gregory's father in Gregory's Girl and as the bank manager in the BBC Scotland sitcom City Lights (1991). Other appearances include roles in  Murder Not Proven? (1984), Soldier Soldier (1996), and Rockface (2002). He also appeared in Taggart in 1986, 1993, 2000, and 2004 and the Scottish comedy Still Game in 2009.
He also played the part of a bus tour company manager in the 1985 film Restless Natives. "I expect flawless reports about you courier. Flawless!!"

Anderson was raised in the town of Rutherglen, and drew on childhood experiences for his 2017 musical Butterfly Kiss. In the course of his theatre career, he was a member of the politically minded 7:84 group and a founder of the Wildcat Stage Productions company along with David MacLennan, and wrote the songs (music and lyrics) for Tony Roper's play The Steamie.

Roles

References

External links
 more useful IMDb
 
Glasgow West End biography

Scottish male film actors
Scottish male television actors
People from Rutherglen
Living people
Male actors from Glasgow
Musicians from Glasgow
20th-century Scottish male actors
21st-century Scottish male actors
Scottish dramatists and playwrights
Scottish male stage actors
20th-century British dramatists and playwrights
21st-century British dramatists and playwrights
1945 births